Housebuster (foaled March 7, 1987, in Kentucky – May 15, 2005) was an American Thoroughbred racehorse and sire.  He was sired by graded stakes race winner Mt. Livermore and was out of the Great Above mare Big Dreams.

Bred by Blanche P. Levy and owned by her son, Robert, Housebuster was originally trained by Ronald Benshoff before being turned over to "Jimmy" Croll.  From the outset he was trained as a sprinter, with no race longer than a mile.

Housebuster won 15 of his lifetime 22 starts, often by wide margins.  He won the Jerome Handicap by 13 lengths, the Grade III Lafayette Stakes by 11, and the "DeFrancis Dash" by 5, beating Breeder's Cup Sprint champ Safely Kept.

In the 1990 Metropolitan Handicap, he placed second by a neck to U.S. Horse of the Year Criminal Type, beating Hall of Fame Eclipse Award Champion Easy Goer while receiving 14 pounds in weight.

Housebuster made the last start of his racing career a winning one on September 28, 1991 in the Vosburgh Stakes at Belmont Park.

His outstanding record earned him the Eclipse Award for the 1990 American Champion Sprint Horse and again in 1991. He became the first horse to win the sprint title in successive years since Great Above's Hall of Fame dam Ta Wee did it in 1969-70.

In 2013, Housebuster was inducted into the National Museum of Racing and Hall of Fame in Saratoga Springs, New York.

At stud
Retired due to an injury in the 1991 Breeder's Cup Sprint, Housebuster was originally sent in 1992 to Jonabell Farm to stand at stud and sired several good runners.  However, as his fee dropped, he was sold and sent to Japan in 1998.

He returned to the U.S. in 2001 and stood at The Blue Ridge Farm in Virginia from 2002-2004 before being moved to O'Sullivan Farms in West Virginia in 2005. He died there on May 15, 2005.

Some of Housebuster's progeny who became graded stakes race winners include 2002 Hong Kong Horse of the Year Electronic Unicorn, Bahamian Pirate, Morluc, and Midnight Bet.

Pedigree

References

External links
 Pedigree & Partial Stats

1987 racehorse births
2005 racehorse deaths
Racehorses bred in Kentucky
Racehorses trained in the United States
Eclipse Award winners
United States Thoroughbred Racing Hall of Fame inductees
American Grade 1 Stakes winners
Thoroughbred family 13